La Corbière (Jèrriais: La Corbiéthe) is the extreme south-western point of Jersey in St. Brélade. The name means "a place where crows gather", deriving from the word corbîn meaning crow. However, seagulls have long since displaced the crows from their coastal nesting sites.

The rocks and extreme tidal variation around this stretch of Jersey's coast have been treacherous for navigation and La Corbière has been the scene of many shipwrecks, including that of the mail packet "Express" on 20 September 1859.

Monument
Sited on the headland overlooking the lighthouse is a monument sculpted by Derek Tristram and erected in April 1997, to commemorate a rescue that took place. The accompanying plaque describes the event:

"During the morning of Monday April 17th 1995 whilst on passage from Jersey to Sark, the French catamaran "Saint-Malo" struck a rock known as La Frouquie, 900 metres north of La Corbière Lighthouse. Visibility was good at the time, but with a spring tide ebbing to the west and a westerly Force 5 wind, the sea conditions near Corbière were moderate to rough."

"Emergency services responded promptly and nearby ships gave assistance. All 307 passengers and crew were saved from the partially submerged vessel."

"This memorial is erected in thanksgiving and as a tribute to the rescue, which with the help of God and of many strong arms, ensured the safe return of all on board."

La Corbière was formerly the western terminus of the Jersey Railway line from Saint Helier. The first through train ran from Saint Helier to La Corbière on 5 August 1885. The service was unable to compete against motor buses and the railway closed in 1935. The States of Jersey purchased the railway track on 1 April 1937, and created a trail now known as the Railway Walk, linking La Corbière and Saint Aubin for pedestrians and cyclists. During the German military occupation 1940-45, the Germans re-established light railways for the purpose of supplying coastal fortifications. A one-metre gauge line was laid down following the route of the former Jersey Railway from Saint Helier to La Corbière, with a branch line connecting the stone quarry at Ronez in Saint John. The German railway infrastructure was dismantled after the Liberation in 1945, but other German fortifications remain, besides the communications tower, and can be seen around the headland.

The former railway platform can still be seen at the end of the Railway Walk at La Corbière and just opposite on the other side of the trail is La Table des Marthes, a megalith. The table-like stone was used historically as a meeting place for the witnessing of contracts and it is conjectured that the name is a corruption of la table des martyres ("martyr" being intended in its meaning of "witness"). Other theories have been put forward to explain the name and purpose of this stone.

Lighthouse

The lighthouse is situated on a rock that is a tidal island. A causeway links the lighthouse to shore at low tide. There is an alarm to warn visitors to clear the causeway as the tide rises; still, there have been casualties among the unwary or unlucky. A plaque adjacent to the causeway commemorates Peter Edwin Larbalestier, assistant keeper of the lighthouse, who was drowned on 28 May 1946, while trying to rescue a visitor cut off by the incoming tide.

The lighthouse tower is 19 m (62 ft) high and the lamp stands 36 m (119 ft) above high water spring tides. It was lit on 24 April 1874, for the first time, and was the first lighthouse in the British Isles to be built of concrete. The lighthouse was built to designs by Sir John Coode.

The lighthouse at La Corbière is one of the most photographed landmarks in Jersey and is a popular tourist site for its panoramic views. In the evenings the surrounding area provides an ideal viewing point for sunsets.

Numismatics
The lighthouse at La Corbière features on the Jersey 5 pound note (see Jersey pound) and the Jersey 20 pence piece (see coins of the Jersey pound)

Culture
The prominence of La Corbière, especially for travellers by sea for whom rounding the rocky waters around the headland often means the roughest part of the journey from Guernsey or England but also the consolation that the boat is entering the final straight towards the harbour of St. Helier, has led to several proverbial expressions in Jèrriais:

 j'avons pâssé La Corbiéthe (we've passed La Corbière, i.e. the worst is over)
 il a pâssé hardi dg'ieau l'tou d'La Corbiéthe (a lot of water has passed round La Corbière, i.e. that's water under the bridge)

MP2 tower

At the top of the headland is a range-finding tower that the German occupying forces built during the Second World War. At that time they camouflaged it with paint to give it an appearance similar to an 18th-century granite round tower.

The tower has 7 floors, including the top floor, which was an originally the flat roof. The top floor is now enclosed with a new roof and glazing. It provides a 360° view out over Jersey's south-west tip.

In 1976 the States' Harbours and Ports Committee added a glassed-in control room where a duty officer could monitor the radio communications of vessels in the English Channel. This lasted until 2004. Since then, Jersey Heritage has turned it into a self-catering accommodation with full facilities that one may rent as holiday accommodation. This is the only German tower in the Channel Islands that is now a self-catering apartment.

See also

List of lighthouses in the Channel Islands

References

Notes

 A Chronology of Jersey, Mollet, Jersey 1954
 Dictionnaire Jersiais-Français, Le Maistre, Jersey 1966

Gallery

External links

Geography of Jersey
Buildings and structures in Saint Brélade
Lighthouses completed in 1874
Towers in Jersey
Lighthouses in Jersey